Miccoli is a surname. Notable people with the surname include:

Fabrizio Miccoli (born 1979), Italian footballer
Giovanni Miccoli (born 1963), Italian rower 
Giuseppe Miccoli (born 1961), Italian long-distance runner

Italian-language surnames